Lagardère Publishing is the book publishing arm of Lagardère Group.

Publishing companies and imprints

France
Calmann-Lévy
Deux Coqs d'Or
Disney Hachette Edition
EDICEF
Editions 1
Editions du Chêne
E.P.A
Éditions Dunod
Editions Foucher
Editions Stock
Fayard
Editions Mille et une nuits
Editions Mazarine
Pauvert
Gautier-Languereau
Grasset
Grasset-Jeunesse
Hachette
Hachette Collections
Hachette Éducation
Hachette Français Langue Etrangère
Hachette Jeunesse
Hachette Littératures
Hachette Pratique
Hachette Tourisme
Harlequin
Hatier
Editions Didier
Didier Jeunesse
éditions Foucher
Rageot Editeur
Hatier International
Hazan
Istra
JC Lattès
Le Livre de Paris
Le Livre de Poche
Le Masque Champs-Élysées
Marabout
Octopus France

United Kingdom
Octopus Publishing Group
Bounty Books
Conran Octopus
Cassell Illustrated
Gaia Books
Godsfield Press
Hamlyn
Mitchell Beazley
Philip's
Spruce
Kyle
Ilex
Chambers Harrap
Hachette Children's Books
Franklin Watts
Orion Publishing Group
Cassell Illustrated
Weidenfeld & Nicolson
 Headline Publishing Group
 John Murray
 Hodder & Stoughton
 H&S Religious
 Quercus
 Hodder Education
 Hodder Arnold
 Hodder Murray
 Hodder Gibson
 Teach Yourself
 Philip Allan Updates
 Chambers Harrap
Little, Brown Book Group (UK)
Abacus
Virago Press
Sphere
Orbit
 Bookpoint (Distribution)
 Littlehampton Book Services (Distribution)

Australia
Hachette Australia
Headline
Hodder
Hodder Educational
Little, Brown and Company
Lothian Books (including Lothian Children’s Books)
Orion
Sceptre
John Murray
Chambers
Hachette Children's Books
Octopus
Piatkus

Canada
Hachette Book Group Canada (English Books)
Hachette Canada (French Books)

China
Hachette-Phoenix (49%)

India
Hachette India (English Books)

Italy
Hachette Fascicoli

Ivory Coast
Nouvelles éditions ivoiriennes (80%)

Japan
Hachette Collections Japan KK

Poland
Wiedza i Życie

Russia
Azbooka-Atticus (49%)

Spain
Grupo Anaya (Anaya, Alianza Editorial, Cátedra, Pirámide...)
Bruño
Salvat Editores

United States
Hachette Book Group USA

See also

Hachette (publishing)
List of largest UK book publishers
 Bertelsmann 
 Elsevier
 Holtzbrinck Publishing Group
 McGraw Hill Education
 Pearson plc
 News Corp
 Scholastic Corporation
 Thomson Reuters
 Wiley (publisher)

References

External links
Hachette.com
Hachette Australia

 
Book publishing companies of France
Companies based in Paris
Lagardère Group